is a Japanese musical producer, musical arranger, writer and composer. He's more known as a founder of music company Being Inc., which provided million seller hits during the 1990s and with his music company provided more than 80 theme songs for anime television series Detective Conan. He was the charge recording producer for the following artist such as Boøwy, Loudness, TUBE, B'z, ZARD, WANDS, Maki Ohguro, DEEN, T-BOLAN, Mai Kuraki, Garnet Crow and Rina Aiuchi.

Life and career

1978-1993
On 1 November 1978, he established music company, Being with Keisuke Tsukimitsu (later known as a main producer of band Lindberg), composer Tetsuro Oda and lyricist Tomoko Aran and others.

In 1989, famous Japanese rock duo B'z debuted under Vermillion Records and by their debut as the first Being artist, he maintained his position officially in the Being Office.

With the debut of band Zard in 1991 and following success of debuting and producing artist next two years, there was a temporal social music phenomenon called as a Being Boom (ビーイングブーム): seven out of ten artist produced by himself were in the Top 10 of the Best Hit Sellers in 1993 Oricon Yearly Single Rankings.

In late 1993, he temporarily retired as a producer because of worsening ear disease. The following producer name has been replaced with BMF (Being Music Factory).

1997-Present
In 1997, four years later he returns to the producing business. Music recording label Zain Records established special label in Kansai, Spoonful and Nagato debuted Miho Komatsu, however four months later the label was renamed into Amemura O-town Record and lasted until 1999.

From this period, he is credited not with his stage name, but instead aliases such as Kanonji and Rockaku.

In 1998, he established music recording label in Osaka, Giza Studio. First artist recorded early demo tapes and officially debuted in February 1999 as The First Artist - New Cinema Tokage, Sweet Velvet and Grass Arcade.

In 2002, was released the series of compilation albums under subtitles at the BEING studio, the song selections are based on his directing choice.

In 2007, he resigned as a representative director of Being.

In 2008, he established the live venue Dojima River Hall.

In July 2013, tax investigations from the Tokyo and Osaka National Tax Offices pointed out about 2 billion yen was missed and 1 billion yen was hidden over the five years from 2007 to 2012. Taking responsibility for this scandal, production activities were suspended until 2014.

In 2016, he returned as an arranger, producer and writer to the project D-project which the letter D is initialed from his name. He uses new initial alias +D.

He's active as a producer as of 2021.

List of provided works as producer

List of produced artist
Junko Mihara
Boøwy
Loudness
Naomi Akimoto
TUBE
Michiya Haruhata
Nobuteru Maeda
Mari Hamada
Yoko Minamino
B.B.Queens
Mi-Ke
Zard
Hideki Saijo
WANDS
T-BOLAN
Maki Ohguro
Manish
Daria Kawashima
DEEN
Zyyg
Keiko Utoku
Baad
REV
Miho Komatsu
Mai Kuraki
Rumania Montevideo
Garnet Crow
Aika Ohno
Rina Aiuchi
U-ka Saegusa in dB
Aiko Kitahara
Aya Kamiki
Natsuki Morikawa
Shinichi Mori
Chicago Poodle
Natsuiro
D-Project
Dps
Sard Underground
Zamb

References

1948 births
Living people
Japanese businesspeople
Japanese composers
Japanese guitarists
Japanese male composers
Japanese music arrangers
Japanese music people
Japanese record producers
Musicians from Shiga Prefecture
People from Ōtsu, Shiga
People from Shiga Prefecture